Stevenson is an unincorporated community in Ohio Township, Warrick County, in the U.S. state of Indiana.

History
Stevenson was first known as Armery, and under the latter name was platted in 1886.

A post office was established at Stevenson in 1890, and remained in operation until it was discontinued in 1904.

Geography

References

Unincorporated communities in Warrick County, Indiana
Unincorporated communities in Indiana